Iset or ISET may refer to:

 Iset, an Ancient Egyptian name
 Isis, a goddess in Ancient Egyptian religious beliefs
 Iset (village), a village in Kachugsky District, Irkutsk Oblast, Russia
 Iset (river), a river in Russia rising in the Ural Mountains and flowing east into the Tobol River
 International Solar Electric Technology is a solar power company
 International School of Economics at Tbilisi State University, a graduate school of economics in Tbilisi
 International Symposium on Endovascular Therapy - trade conference
 Inner sphere electron transfer, a mechanism of electron transfer in inorganic chemistry
 Institut Supérieur des Études Technologiques, or Higher Institute of Technological Studies, a class of universities in Tunisia
 ISET Test, a diagnostic blood test that detects circulating tumor cells in a blood sample